Hans-Hermann Evers (22 October 1930 – 31 May 2017) was a German equestrian. He competed in two events at the 1952 Summer Olympics.

References

External links
 

1930 births
2017 deaths
German male equestrians
Olympic equestrians of Germany
Equestrians at the 1952 Summer Olympics
People from Dithmarschen
Sportspeople from Schleswig-Holstein